Rot (Elfdalian: Ruot) is a locality situated in Älvdalen Municipality, Dalarna County, Sweden with 695 inhabitants in 2010.

References 

Populated places in Dalarna County
Populated places in Älvdalen Municipality